John Brancato and Michael Ferris are former American screenwriting duo, whose notable works include The Game, Terminator 3: Rise of the Machines, Terminator Salvation, Surrogates and The Hunter's Prayer. Brancato and Ferris met while at college, where both were editors of The Harvard Lampoon. The two have also been credited pseudonymously under the names Henry Dominic and Henry Dominick.  Their partnership ended in 2015. Ferris has since separately written two episodes of The Simpsons, "Paths of Glory" and "From Russia Without Love", and the video game adaptation Dead Rising: Endgame.

Filmography

Film writers
 Watchers II (1990)
 Bloodfist II (1990) (John Brancato's uncredited story role)
 Femme Fatale (1991)
 Into the Sun (1992)
 Interceptor (1992)
 The Net (1995)
 The Game (1997)
 Terminator 3: Rise of the Machines (2003)
 Catwoman (2004)
 Primeval (2007)
 Terminator Salvation (2009)
 Surrogates (2009)
 The Hunter's Prayer (2017)

Credited as Henry Dominic 
 The Unborn (1991)
 Severed Ties (1992) 
 Mindwarp (1992)

Television

References

External links
 Delusional Films (their production company)
 
 
 
 

American male screenwriters
Screenwriting duos
Living people
The Harvard Lampoon alumni
American television writers
American male television writers
Year of birth missing (living people)